The Armstrong Siddeley Hurricane is a two-door, four-seat drophead coupé automobile produced by the British company of Armstrong Siddeley from 1946 until 1953. It was based on the Armstrong Siddeley Lancaster saloon.

The chassis featured independent front suspension using torsion bars and a live rear axle with leaf springs. A Girling hydro-mechanical braking system was fitted, with the front drums hydraulically operated while those at the rear used rod and cable.

Early models of the Hurricane were fitted with a 70 bhp 1991 cc six-cylinder, overhead-valve engine, carried over from the pre-war 16 hp model but beginning in 1949 this was enlarged to a 75 bhp 2309 cc by increasing the cylinder bore from 65 to 70 mm. There was a choice of 4-speed synchromesh or pre-selector gearbox.

The four-seat, two-door body was made of steel and aluminum panel fitted over a wood and aluminum frame. The doors were rear hinged, an arrangement that got the name of suicide doors.  Changes during the model life were minimal: however, the bonnet line was slightly lowered for 1948 when the car also acquired stoneguards on the leading edges of its rear wings.

At launch, the car cost £1151 on the UK market.

References

External links
 Armstrong Siddeley 16-18 hp model range

Hurricane
Cars introduced in 1946
1950s cars